Piero Rebaudengo (born 13 September 1958) is an Italian former volleyball player who competed in the 1984 Summer Olympics.

He was born in Turin.

In 1984 he was part of the Italian team which won the bronze medal in the Olympic tournament. He played all six matches.

External links
 profile

1958 births
Living people
Italian men's volleyball players
Olympic volleyball players of Italy
Volleyball players at the 1984 Summer Olympics
Olympic bronze medalists for Italy
Sportspeople from Turin
Olympic medalists in volleyball
Medalists at the 1984 Summer Olympics